T.120 is a suite of point-to-multipoint communication protocols for teleconferencing, videoconferencing, and computer-supported collaboration. It provides for application sharing, online chat, file sharing, and other functions. The protocols are standardised by the ITU Telecommunication Standardization Sector (ITU-T).

T.120 has been implemented in various real-time collaboration programmes, including WebEx and NetMeeting. IBM Sametime switched from the T.120 protocols to HTTP(S) in version 8.5.

The prefix T designates the ITU subcommittee that developed the standard, but it is not an abbreviation. The ITU (re)assigns these prefixes to committees incrementally and in alphabetic order.

The T.123 standard specifies that T.120 protocols use network port 1503 when communicating over TCP/IP.

Components

See also

References

External links
 

ITU-T recommendations
ITU-T T Series Recommendations